Chrysolarentia plagiocausta, the black-lined carpet, is a moth of the family Geometridae first described by Alfred Jefferis Turner in 1904. It is found in the Australian Capital Territory, Tasmania and Victoria.

The wingspan is about 30 mm.

External links
Australian Faunal Directory

Moths of Australia
Euphyia
Moths described in 1904